blindekuh are two restaurants where patrons are served in the dark. The restaurants are located in Basel and Zürich, Switzerland. The name is derived from "Blinde Kuh" (blind cow), the German name for Blind man's bluff.

No lights are allowed inside a blindekuh. Patrons are served by blind and visually impaired people. Both locations offer cultural events such as readings or concerts in the dark.

The dark restaurants are a project of the Blind-Liecht (Swiss German for blind-light) foundation. The foundation works to create employment opportunities for blind and visually impaired people. Their first venture, the blindekuh in Zürich, opened on September 17, 1999 and is claimed to be the world's first dark restaurant. The second location opened in Spring 2005 in Basel.

blindekuh won several awards, among them the Social Innovations Award of the Institute for Social Innovations in London.

The restaurant concept has subsequently been replicated elsewhere, including in London, Paris, Sydney, Amsterdam, Tel Aviv, Beijing, and Vancouver as restaurants and multiple cities in the United States as special events.

See also
 List of restaurants in Switzerland
 Black Restaurant (Japan)
 Dans le Noir (France)

References

External links
 blindekuh.ch  Official homepage 

Darkness
Regional restaurant chains
1999 establishments in Switzerland
Restaurants in Zürich
Restaurants established in 1999